NPC International was one of the largest restaurant franchisees and was one of the largest restaurant operators of any kind in the United States. NPC was the largest franchisee of both Pizza Hut and Wendy's, and owned more than 1,200 Pizza Hut locations and 385 Wendy's locations until March 2021.

O. Gene Bicknell opened his first franchised Pizza Hut restaurant in Pittsburg, Kansas in 1962. In 1984, Bicknell and NPC went public, finishing the decade with 320 locations. In the 1990s, NPC acquired, and then later sold, both Skippers Seafood & Chowder House and Tony Roma's restaurant chains. Under the leadership of CEO Jim Schwartz, the company went private in 2001 and underwent two separate private equity acquisitions in 2006 and 2011. In 2013, NPC acquired its first Wendy's restaurants.

NPC filed for Chapter 11 bankruptcy on July 1, 2020. Analysts pointed to a "perfect storm of problems...including coronavirus-related shutdowns, a massive debt burden of nearly $1 billion and rising labor and food costs." NPC reached an agreement with Pizza Hut to close 300 of its locations. Following the closures, the leases of 163 of the former sites were put up for sale.

In November 2020, Flynn Restaurant Group submitted a $816 million bid to acquire the entirety of NPC's business, exceeding NPC's asking price of $725 million.

References 

Restaurant groups in the United States
Pizza Hut
Wendy's International
Companies that filed for Chapter 11 bankruptcy in 2020
American companies established in 1962
Restaurants established in 1962
1962 establishments in Kansas